Bavar (also known as Peykaap II) is a class of fast patrol craft which is capable of firing both anti-ship missile and torpedo, and is operated by the Navy of the Islamic Revolutionary Guard Corps of Iran.

Design 
Peykaap II is a modified version of North Korean IPS-16, manufactured by Iran.

Dimensions and machinery 
It uses one surface piercing propeller, powered by two diesel engines.

Armament 
It is also compatible with Chinese C-701/FL-10 anti-ship missiles.

References

External links 
 Profile at globalsecurity.org
 Profile at cmano-db.com 

Fast patrol boat classes of the Navy of the Islamic Revolutionary Guard Corps
Torpedo boat classes
Missile boat classes
Ships built by Marine Industries Organization